The Balearic shrew (Nesiotites hidalgo) is an extinct species of shrew from Majorca and Menorca, in the Balearic Islands of Spain, belonging to the endemic genus Nesiotites. It was one of three native land mammals to the Balearic Islands, alongside Myotragus and Hypnomys. Nesotites has been present in the Balearic Islands for over 5 million years since the Late Miocene-Early Pliocene, and is the final and largest chronospecies of the lineage. It was relatively large for a shrew, being estimated to weigh between 20 and 30 grams. Among living shrews it is most closely related to the Himalayan shrew, from which it diverged around 6.44 million years ago and has a probable close relationship with the extinct genus Asoriculus of mainland Europe and Corsica-Sardinia.

See also
 List of extinct animals of Europe

References

Nesiotites
Extinct mammals of Europe
Extinct mammals
Holocene extinctions
Endemic fauna of the Balearic Islands